The 2012–13 Seattle Redhawks men's basketball team represented Seattle University during the 2012–13 NCAA Division I men's basketball season. The Redhawks, led by fourth year head coach Cameron Dollar, played their home games at KeyArena, with one home game at the ShoWare Center, and were first year members of the Western Athletic Conference. They finished the season 8–22, 3–15 in WAC play to finish in last place. They lost in the first round of the WAC tournament to Texas State.

Roster

Schedule

|-
!colspan=9| Exhibition
 
|-
!colspan=9| Regular season

|-
!colspan=9| 2013 WAC tournament

References

Seattle Redhawks men's basketball seasons
Seattle
Seattle Seahawks Washington (state)
Seattle Redhawks men's basketball
Seattle Redhawks
Seattle Redhawks